Wilson D. "Pete" Burness (June 16, 1904 – July 21, 1969) was an American animator and animation director. He was perhaps best known for his work on the Mr. Magoo series. He also contributed to the Tom and Jerry series, Looney Tunes, Merrie Melodies, and Rocky and His Friends.

Biography

Burness was born in Los Angeles. His animation career began in 1930, working for Romer Grey and Ted Eshbaugh on Goofy Goat Antics and the unreleased Binko the Cub. In 1933 he transferred to Van Beuren Studios, where he animated the film adaption of The Little King. Burness transferred to Harman-Ising in 1936 and to the Metro-Goldwyn-Mayer cartoon studio in 1938. He animated Tom and Jerry at MGM until 1947.

Burness worked briefly for Warner Brothers in 1948 and 1949, animating a number of Looney Tunes and Merrie Melodies shorts, under Chuck Jones, Friz Freleng and Bob McKimson. He left Warner to become a director for United Productions of America, animating the popular Mr. Magoo series. Two of his Mr. Magoo shorts, When Magoo Flew (1954) and Mr. Magoo's Puddle Jumper (1956), won Academy Awards for Best Short Subject.

In 1958 Burness left UPA to join Jay Ward Productions as director of Rocky and his Friends and Hoppity Hooper. While working for Jay Ward he co-wrote and was hired to direct 1001 Arabian Nights, a feature film featuring Mr. Magoo. Following disputes with producer Stephen Bosustow, he left the project and was replaced by Jack Kinney.

Burness died of pancreatic cancer in 1969.

References

.
The New York Times. "Pete Burness Biography", New York, September 8, 2010.

External links

1904 births
1969 deaths
Animators from California
American animated film directors
Directors of Best Animated Short Academy Award winners
Warner Bros. Cartoons people
Artists from Los Angeles
20th-century American artists
Metro-Goldwyn-Mayer cartoon studio people